The term abdominis is an old Latin term for abdomen. In modern times, it is still used in anatomical classification of muscles in the human abdomen, such as:

Rectus abdominis muscle
Transverse abdominal muscle